Michel Van Tuyckom (born 23 November 1954) is a Belgian field hockey player. He competed in the men's tournament at the 1976 Summer Olympics.

References

External links
 

1954 births
Living people
Belgian male field hockey players
Olympic field hockey players of Belgium
Field hockey players at the 1976 Summer Olympics
People from Uccle
Field hockey players from Brussels